The Cook of Canyon Camp is a lost 1917 American drama silent film directed by Donald Crisp and written by Donald Crisp and Julia Crawford Ivers. The film stars George Beban, Monroe Salisbury, Florence Vidor, Helen Jerome Eddy and John Burton. The film was released on July 19, 1917, by Paramount Pictures.

Plot

Cast 
George Beban as Jean
Monroe Salisbury as Silent Jack
Florence Vidor as Mrs. Jack
Helen Jerome Eddy as Marie
John Burton as Marie's Father

References

External links 
 

1917 films
1910s English-language films
Silent American drama films
1917 drama films
Paramount Pictures films
Films directed by Donald Crisp
American black-and-white films
American silent feature films
Lost American films
1917 lost films
Lost drama films
1910s American films